Donatus Edet Akpan (born 1952) is the current bishop of the Roman Catholic Diocese of Ogoja. 

Akpan was born in Ikat Ada Utor. This is within the area covered by the Roman Catholic Diocese of Ikot Ekpene. He studied at Queen of Angels Minor Seminary and then at Bigard Memorial Seminary of Enugu and St. Joseph Major Seminary also in Enugu. He was ordained a priest in October 1985. He went on to do advanced studies in biblical theology at the University of Nigeria, Nsukka. Much of his ministry before he was made a bishop was as a priest and rector in the Roman Catholic Archdiocese of Abuja.  He was made appointed bishop of Ogoja in April 2017 and ordained as such in July.

References

External links
Announcement of Akpan's appointment as a bishop
Catholic Hierarchy entry for Akpan 

1952 births
Living people
21st-century Roman Catholic bishops in Nigeria
Roman Catholic bishops of Ogoja